Chifunde District is a district of Tete Province in western Mozambique. The principal town is 
Chifunde. The district is located in the north of the province, and borders with Zambia in the north, Malawi in the northeast, Macanga District in the east, Chiuta District in the south, and with Marávia District in the west. It has a population of 101,811 as of 2007.

Geography
The Kapoche River makes the eastern border of the district, and the Luangua River makes its western border. Both are major left tributaries of the Zambezi.

Demographics
As of 2005, 49% of the population of the district was younger than 15 years. 7% of the population spoke Portuguese. The most common mothertongue among the population was Cinyungwe. 88% were analphabetic, mostly women.

Administrative divisions
The district is divided into three postos, Chifunde (three localities), Mualadzi (two localities), and N'sadzo (two localities).

Economy
Less than 1% of the households in the district have access to electricity.

Agriculture
In the district, there are 13,000 farms which have on average  of land. The main agricultural products are corn, cassava, cowpea, peanut, tobacco, and sweet potato.

Transportation

References

Districts in Tete Province